The following contains a list of trading losses of the equivalent of USD100 million or higher. Trading losses are the amount of principal losses in an account. Because of the secretive nature of many hedge funds and fund managers, some notable losses may never be reported to the public. The list is ordered by the real amount lost, starting with the greatest.

This list includes both fraudulent and non-fraudulent losses, but excludes those associated with Bernie Madoff's Ponzi scheme (estimated in the $50 billion range) as Madoff did not lose most of this money in trading.

See also 
 Rogue trader
 Derivative (finance)
 Silver Thursday
 Sumitomo copper affair

References 

Lists by economic indicators
Stock market-related lists

International trade-related lists